The Collins base is an Antarctic shelter located in the Collins Glacier that is in the Collins Bay in the Fildes Peninsula, King George Island. It was inaugurated at the 2006-2007 season and is administrated by the Instituto Antártico Chileno (INACH).

It has capacity for two persons in summer, and it is used for scientific research. It has communications with VHF radio and the logistical support comes from the Profesor Julio Escudero Base by sea.

The base replaced one with the same name, built in 1969, was given to the Uruguayan Antarctic Institute in 1984 and dismantled in 1989, located in what today is the Artigas Base from Uruguay.

See also
 List of Antarctic research stations
 List of Antarctic field camps

References

External links 
 Refugio Collins INACH
 Photo of the base
 Scientific research near the base

Buildings and structures in the South Shetland Islands
King George Island (South Shetland Islands)
Chilean Antarctic Territory
2006 establishments in Antarctica